Jim Conroy (born September 17, 1970) is an American actor and television writer known for appearing on television shows and movies, such as The Cuphead Show!, Jellystone!, Kenny the Shark and Fetch! with Ruff Ruffman, as well as numerous radio commercials and video games. He has worked for WGBH, Hanna Barbera, The Walt Disney Company and Discovery Channel.

Career
Conroy began his career on MTV2's Celebrity Deathmatch. His first major role was Kenny the Shark for Discovery Kids. He later voiced Mr. Duck on Disney Channel's Mr. Pig & Mr. Duck and made special appearances on Saturday Night Live in 2005. In 2007, he was awarded the Golden Hammer of Humor award. Conroy also voices Steve the Shark in Fiber One's granola bar commercials.

Filmography

Animation
 The Cuphead Show! - Ollie Bulb, Jasper and Duke
 The Casagrandes – Candy Goblin
 Jellystone! – Huckleberry Hound, Captain Caveman, Paw Rugg, Yahooey, Bingo
 Rio 2 – Capoeira Turtle
 Epic – Race Announcer, Additional Voices
 Ice Age: Continental Drift – Additional Voices
 Top Cat: The Movie – Additional Voices
 Kung Fu Magoo – Mr. Magoo
 Fetch! with Ruff Ruffman – Ruff Ruffman and all the Ruffman family members for the show and its spin-offs.
 Kenny the Shark - Kenny
 Celebrity Deathmatch – Various Celebrities
 Night at the Museum: Kahmunrah Rises Again – Alexander Hamilton

Video games
 Red Dead Redemption 2 – Chelonian Master / Anders Helgerson
 Grand Theft Auto V – Butch
 Star Wars: The Old Republic – Additional Voices
 Red Dead Redemption – Andrew McAllister
 Grand Theft Auto IV: The Ballad of Gay Tony – Butch / Soldier
 Grand Theft Auto IV: The Lost and Damned – Butch / Hispanic Alien
 Order Up! – Hashi Ichiro / Bob Manhorn / Generic Patron
 Grand Theft Auto IV – Butch

TV appearances
 Neon Joe, Werewolf Hunter – Announcer
 Manhattan Love Story – Not So Deaf Guy
 Saturday Night Live – Mr. President

Film appearances
 Mooch – Hans
 Sender – Virgil Haraday
 Captain Blackout – Billy the Porter
 Montclair – Open-Mic Host

Commercials
 Fiber One – Voice of Steve the Shark
 AT&T – Bearded Man
 Captain D's – Voice of Desmond the "D-Gull"
 Kraft Dressing – Voice Over
 Pop-Tarts – Voice of Lizard, Additional Voices
 TD Ameritrade – Financial Advisor
 Xiidra – Biff

Shorts
 The Game – JP
 Caddie Video – Wally the Bad Caddie
 SW 2.5 (The Pitch Wars) – Steven Spielberg, Robert Altman, Larry Wachowski, James Earl Jones-Type Ant

References

External links
 

Living people
American male stage actors
American male video game actors
American male voice actors
People from Ellenville, New York
20th-century American male actors
21st-century American male actors
1970 births